Imintanoute is a town in Chichaoua Province, Marrakesh-Safi, Morocco. According to the 2004 census it has a population of 17,067.

See also 

 Chichaoua
 Sid L Mukhtar
 Sidi Zouine

References

Populated places in Chichaoua Province
Municipalities of Morocco